Gourriel is the surname of the following people 
Lourdes Gourriel (born 1957), Cuban baseball player
Lourdes Gourriel Jr. or Lourdes Gurriel Jr.(born 1993), Cuban baseball player, son of Lourdes Gourriel
Yuli Gourriel or Yuli Gurriel (born 1984), Cuban baseball player, son of Lourdes Gourriel